Temnocerus is a genus of beetles belonging to the family Attelabidae.

The species of this genus are found in Europe and Northern America.

Species:
 Temnocerus abdominalis Legalov, 2003 
 Temnocerus aeratoides Legalov, 2003

References

Attelabidae